Kate McCarthy (born 24 October 1992) is a former Australian rules footballer who played for the Brisbane Lions, St Kilda Football Club, and Hawthorn Football Club in the AFL Women's (AFLW).

Early and personal life
McCarthy played for Yeronga South Brisbane in the QWAFL before signing for the Lions. She has represented Australia for touch rugby league to at least as high as the under-20s age group. As of 2017, she works as a mathematics and physical education teacher at Clairvaux MacKillop College. She has required an implanted pacemaker since the age of ten.

AFL Women's career
McCarthy was taken with the number 82 pick by Brisbane in the 2016 AFL Women's draft. She made her debut in the Lions' inaugural game against Melbourne at Casey Fields in the opening round of the 2017 AFL Women's season. McCarthy is noted for her speed and ability to kick the ball accurately while sprinting.

At the end of the season, McCarthy was listed in the 2017 All-Australian team.

Brisbane signed McCarthy for the 2018 season during the trade period in May 2017.

In April 2019, McCarthy joined expansion club St Kilda, along with fellow Brisbane player Nat Exon.

In May 2022, McCarthy was delisted by St Kilda to allow her to explore her options. Following her delisting, she was signed by expansion club Hawthorn as a delisted free agent.

Statistics
Updated to the end of S7 (2022).

|-
| 2017 ||  || 9
| 8 || 9 || 1 || 38 || 11 || 49 || 9 || 21 || 1.1 || 0.1 || 4.8 || 1.4 || 6.1 || 1.1 || 2.6 || 0
|-
| 2018 ||  || 9
| 8 || 1 || 2 || 37 || 9 || 46 || 14 || 13 || 0.1 || 0.3 || 4.6 || 1.1 || 5.8 || 1.8 || 1.6 || 0
|-
| 2019 ||  || 9
| 7 || 6 || 4 || 32 || 8 || 40 || 7 || 20 || 0.9 || 0.6 || 4.6 || 1.1 || 5.7 || 1.0 || 2.9 || 0
|-
| 2020 ||  || 9
| 4 || 1 || 0 || 26 || 10 || 36 || 6 || 8 || 0.3 || 0.0 || 6.5 || 2.5 || 9.0 || 1.5 || 2.0 || 0
|-
| 2021 ||  || 9
| 6 || 1 || 2 || 26 || 8 || 34 || 7 || 3 || 0.2 || 0.3 || 4.3 || 1.3 || 5.7 || 1.2 || 0.5 || 0
|-
| 2022 ||  || 9
| 6 || 0 || 2 || 37 || 5 || 42 || 5 || 5 || 0.0 || 0.3 || 6.2 || 0.8 || 7.0 || 0.8 || 0.8 || 0
|-
| S7 (2022) ||  || 9
| 3 || 0 || 0 || 11 || 2 || 13 || 6 || 6 || 0.0 || 0.0 || 3.7 || 0.7 || 4.3 || 2.0 || 2.0 || 0
|- class="sortbottom"
! colspan=3| Career
! 42 !! 18 !! 11 !! 207 !! 53 !! 260 !! 54 !! 76 !! 0.4 !! 0.3 !! 4.9 !! 1.3 !! 6.2 !! 1.3 !! 1.8 !! 0
|}

Honours and achievements
Team
 AFL Women's minor premiership: 2017

Individual
 AFL Women's All-Australian team: 2017
 Brisbane leading goalkicker: 2017

References

External links

Living people
1996 births
Sportspeople from Brisbane
Sportswomen from Queensland
Australian rules footballers from Queensland
Brisbane Lions (AFLW) players
All-Australians (AFL Women's)
Touch footballers
St Kilda Football Club (AFLW) players
Hawthorn Football Club (AFLW) players